Two submarines of the British Royal Navy have been named HMS Tireless:

  was a Taciturn- or T-class submarine that served during the Cold War

Royal Navy ship names